The women's 100 metres at the 2015 Asian Athletics Championships was held on the 3 and 4 of June.

Medalists

Results

Heats
First 3 in each heat (Q) and the next 4 fastest (q) advanced to the semifinals.

Wind:Heat 1: -0.2 m/s, Heat 2: -0.9 m/s, Heat 3: -1.0 m/s, Heat 4: -0.6 m/s

Semifinals
First 3 in each semifinal (Q) and the next 2 fastest (q) advanced to the final.

Wind:Heat 1: +0.7 m/s, Heat 2: +1.4 m/s

Final
Wind: +2.5 m/s

References
Results

100
100 metres at the Asian Athletics Championships
2015 in women's athletics